Cole Heppell (born November 11, 1993) is a Canadian actor. In 2006, he was nominated for a Young Artist Award of Best Performance in a Television Series (Comedy or Drama) - Guest Starring Young Actor for: The Dead Zone: Heroes & Demons.

In 2012, Cole was nominated at the 33rd Young Artist Awards for his supporting role as the village fool in Red Riding Hood. He studied at the University of Alberta.

Filmography

Films

TV series

References

External links

 

1993 births
Living people
Canadian male film actors
Male actors from Calgary